Yalang Gewog (Dzongkha: ཡ་ལང་) is a gewog (village block) of Trashiyangtse District, Bhutan.

References

Gewogs of Bhutan
Trashiyangtse District